Soudan is a commune in the Loire-Atlantique department in western France.

The river Verzée rises in the north-western part of the commune, then flows eastward through its northern part; the river Chère rises in the southern part of the commune, then flows northwestward through its western part.

See also
Communes of the Loire-Atlantique department

References

Communes of Loire-Atlantique